Józef Kubiński (8 March 1898 – 11 January 1968) was a Polish footballer. He played in three matches for the Poland national football team from 1926 to 1928.

References

External links
 

1898 births
1968 deaths
Polish footballers
Poland international footballers
Place of birth missing
Association footballers not categorized by position